Joseph Akichi (born 1933 in Memni) was an Ivorian clergyman and bishop for the Roman Catholic Diocese of Grand-Bassam. He became ordained in 1963. He was appointed bishop in 1982. He died in 1993.

References

20th-century Roman Catholic bishops in Ivory Coast
1933 births
1993 deaths
People from Lagunes District
Roman Catholic bishops of Grand-Bassam